Alsace is a rural locality in the Central Highlands Region, Queensland, Australia.

Geography 
A number of creek flow through the locality towards its south-east where in neighbouring Dingo, they become tributaries of Lorraine Creek, which  flows into the Mackenzie River and then the Fitzroy River, which enters the Coral Sea to the south of Rockhampton.

The Fitzroy Developmental Road forms the western boundary of the locality which has no internal roads.

History 
The locality is named after a pastoral property on the Leichhardt River. In the early 1870s, F.A. Brodie named two adjoining properties Alsace and Lorraine after the two regions Alsace and Lorraine in France that were lost to Germany in the Franco-Prussian War.

Alsace State School opened on 9 Aug 1977 and closed on 11 December 1987.

Education 
There are no schools in Alsace. The nearest primary school is in neighbouring Dingo to the south, approximately 70 kilometres away. The nearest secondary schools are in Blackwater and Middlemount, even further away. Distance education is another option available for children in the local area.

References 

Central Highlands Region
Localities in Queensland